Saint-Denis-de-Palin is a commune in the Cher department in the Centre-Val de Loire region of France.

Geography

Population

Sights
 The church of St. Denis, dating from the twelfth century.
 The eighteenth-century chateau.
 A feudal motte.
 Evidence of Roman occupation.

See also
Communes of the Cher department

References

External links

Annuaire Mairie website 

Communes of Cher (department)